Buczki   (German: Schönfelde) is a settlement in the administrative district of Gmina Tychowo, within Białogard County, West Pomeranian Voivodeship, in north-western Poland. For the history of the region, see History of Pomerania.

References

Buczki